Châteauneuf-sur-Loire is a commune in the Loiret department in north-central France.

Population

Twin towns
  Amarante, Portugal
  Bad Laasphe, Germany

See also
 Communes of the Loiret department

References

Chateauneufsurloire